The Al Noor Tower is a cancelled 540 meters skyscraper that was to be built in Casablanca, Morocco. If built, it would have been the tallest building in Africa. The concept of the tower was created by a French designer, Amédée Santalo, based in Dubai. The owner is Sheikh Tarek bin Laden, the half brother of Osama bin Laden. The project was canceled in 2018.

See also
List of tallest buildings in Morocco
List of tallest buildings in Africa

References

Proposed skyscrapers
Proposed buildings and structures in Morocco